Raymond Rudolf Valentine Paul (21 November 1928 – 23 December 2013) was a British fencer.

Fencing career
He competed at the 1952 and 1956 Summer Olympics with the best individual result of eighth place in the foil in 1956. He won four national foil titles at the British Fencing Championships, from 1953 to 1958. and a bronze medal in the team foil at the 1955 World Championships.

He represented England and won a double gold in the foil individual and team events at the 1958 British Empire and Commonwealth Games in Cardiff, Wales.

Personal life

Paul was the son of a French fencing master, who settled in London. He was the brother of René Paul, ex-husband of June Foulds-Paul, uncle of Barry Paul and Graham Paul and father of Steven Paul.

In the 1955 film The Dark Avenger, Raymond Paul doubled for Errol Flynn during one sword duel, due to Flynn's taking ill at the time.

Paul died on 23rd December 2013 and was buried on the eastern side of Highgate Cemetery.

References

1928 births
2013 deaths
Burials at Highgate Cemetery
British male fencers
Olympic fencers of Great Britain
Fencers at the 1952 Summer Olympics
Fencers at the 1956 Summer Olympics
Commonwealth Games medallists in fencing
Commonwealth Games gold medallists for England
Fencers at the 1958 British Empire and Commonwealth Games
Medallists at the 1958 British Empire and Commonwealth Games